The 2009 World Junior Curling Championships were held from 5 March 2009 to 15 March 2009 in the newly completed Vancouver Olympic/Paralympic Centre, which was the site for curling during the 2010 Vancouver Winter Olympics.

Men

Teams

Round-robin standings
Final round-robin standings

Round-robin results

Draw 1
Thursday, March 5, 14:00

Draw 2
Friday, March 6, 9:00

Draw 3
Friday, March 6, 19:00

Draw 4
Saturday, March 7, 14:00

Draw 5
Sunday, March 8, 9:00

Draw 6
Sunday, March 8, 19:00

Draw 7
Monday, March 9, 14:00

Draw 8
Tuesday, March 10, 9:00

Draw 9
Tuesday, March 10, 19:00

Draw 10
Wednesday, March 11, 14:00

Draw 11
Thursday, March 12, 8:30

Draw 12
Thursday, March 12, 19:00

Playoffs

1 vs. 2 Game
Friday, March 13, 14:00

3 vs. 4 Game
Friday, March 13, 14:00

Semifinals
Saturday, March 14, 19:00

Bronze-medal game
Sunday, March 15, 13:00

Gold-medal game
Sunday, March 15, 13:00

Women

Teams

Round-robin standings
Final round-robin standings

Round-robin results

Draw 1
Thursday, March 5, 9:00

Draw 2
Thursday, March 5, 19:30

Draw 3
Friday, March 6, 14:00

Draw 4
Saturday, March 7, 9:00

Draw 5
Saturday, March 7, 19:00

Draw 6
Sunday, March 8, 19:00

Draw 7
Monday, March 9, 9:00

Draw 8
Monday, March 9, 19:00

Draw 9
Tuesday, March 10, 14:00

Draw 10
Wednesday, March 11, 9:00

Draw 11
Wednesday, March 11, 19:00

Draw 12
Thursday, March 12, 13:00

Tiebreakers
Friday, March 13, 9:00

Friday, March 13, 14:00

Playoffs

1 vs. 2 Game
Friday, March 13, 19:00

3 vs. 4 Game
Friday, March 13, 19:00

Semifinal
Saturday, March 14, 19:00

Bronze-medal game
Sunday, March 15, 13:00

Gold-medal game
Sunday, March 15, 13:00

References

External links 

World Junior Curling Championships, 2009
World Junior Curling Championships
Sports competitions in Vancouver
Curling in British Columbia
2009 in Canadian curling
International curling competitions hosted by Canada
2000s in Vancouver
March 2009 sports events in Canada
2009 in British Columbia
2009 in youth sport